Martin Turis (born 27 August, 1993) is a Slovak volleyball player for VK Bystrina SPU Nitra and the Slovak national team.

He participated in the 2017 Men's European Volleyball Championship.

References

1993 births
Living people
Slovak men's volleyball players